Huqiu District is one of five urban districts of Suzhou, Jiangsu province, China. The district is named after Tiger Hill, a historically famous hill and tourist attraction.

Nowadays, Huqiu District is promoted to be Suzhou High-tech Zone  (Suzhou Gaoxin Qu  ).

Administrative divisions
In the present, Huqiu District has 3 subdistricts and 3 towns.
3 subdistricts
 Fengqiao
 Shishan
 Hengtang

3 towns
 Hushuguan
 Tong'an
 Dongzhu

The attraction places

Huqiu Wedding Market

Huqiu wedding market, also known as the Huqiu wedding dress street or Tiger Hill Wedding Market, located in Tiger Hill Road, Jinchang District, Suzhou, is one of the famous wedding dress domestic production base, and there are near 1200 factories producing wedding & evening dresses in Suzhou, but manufacturers like JUSERE could offer professional design & custom service are no many in Suzhou, most of wedding dress factories you may find are medium-scale, like Fannybrides factory. Since 2012, Huqiu wedding market has become the largest production and sales base, and over 30 countries around the world to have business dealings, perennial orders. Manufactured by individuals in workshops, the wedding dresses win customers' praises since they're able to provide it at an affordable price while remaining fashionable. In fact, the wedding dress supply is often unable to meet the demand of wedding seasons throughout spring, autumn and winter. Also, it attracts foreign merchants seeking to customize wedding dresses.

Huqiu Wedding Dress Street
There are hundreds of wedding shops and boutiques in Huqiu wedding dress street, thousands of wedding dress factories manufacturing wedding & evening dress, but most of them are family workshops. Some strong and reliable manufacturers like Jusere owning the professional design team produce quality wedding & evening dress.

References

 
Administrative divisions of Suzhou
County-level divisions of Jiangsu